Arthur Buchwald Edgar Gibson (15 June 1863 – 11 March 1932) was an English cricketer active from 1887 to 1896 who played for Lancashire. He was born in Salford and died in Cambridge. He appeared in 14 first-class matches as a righthanded batsman who bowled right arm medium pace. He scored 311 runs with a highest score of 58 and held four catches. He took 16 wickets with a best analysis of three for 24.

Notes

1863 births
1932 deaths
English cricketers
Lancashire cricketers
Marylebone Cricket Club cricketers
West of England cricketers
Lord Hawke's XI cricketers
A. J. Webbe's XI cricketers